Marcian Edward "Ted" Hoff Jr. (born October 28, 1937 in Rochester, New York) is one of the inventors of the microprocessor.

Education and work history
Hoff received a bachelor's degree in electrical engineering from the Rensselaer Polytechnic Institute in 1958. He applied for his first two patents based on work done for the General Railway Signal Corp. of Rochester, New York during the summers of his undergraduate study.  He received a National Science Foundation Fellowship to enroll in Stanford University, where he received his master's degree in 1959 and his Ph.D. in 1962.  As part of his Ph.D. dissertation, Hoff co-invented the least mean squares filter with Bernard Widrow.

Hoff joined Intel in 1968 as employee number 12, and is credited with coming up with the idea of using a "universal processor" rather than a variety of custom-designed circuits in the architectural idea and an instruction set formulated with Stanley Mazor in 1969 for the Intel 4004—the chip that started the microprocessor revolution in the early 1970s. Development of the silicon-gate design methodology and the actual chip design was done by Federico Faggin, who also led the project during 1970-1971. Masatoshi Shima from Busicom defined the logic.

In 1980, Hoff was named the first Intel Fellow, which is the highest technical position in the company. He stayed in that position until 1983 when he left for Atari.

Popular culture
Hoff was featured in an Intel advertisement, calling him the "rock star" of Intel and comparing him to the rock stars of American culture.

Awards
In 1954, he was one of the Westinghouse Science Talent Search (now Intel STS) finalists. He was awarded the Stuart Ballantine Medal in 1979, the IEEE Cledo Brunetti Award in 1980, and the Franklin Institute Certificate of Merit in 1996.  He was inducted into the National Inventors Hall of Fame in 1996 and received the National Medal of Technology and Innovation in 2009 from President Barack Obama. He was made a Fellow of the Computer History Museum in 2009 "for his work as part of the team that developed the Intel 4004, the world's first commercial microprocessor." He received the 2011 IEEE/RSE Wolfson James Clerk Maxwell Award.

References

1937 births
Living people
Rensselaer Polytechnic Institute alumni
People from Rochester, New York
Stanford University School of Engineering alumni
20th-century American inventors
21st-century American inventors
American electronics engineers
Computer hardware engineers
Intel people
Engineers from New York (state)
Kyoto laureates in Advanced Technology